Frederick, Freddie or Fred Clarke may refer to:

Sport
Fred Clarke (1872–1960), American baseball player
Fred Clarke (Australian footballer) (1932–2020), Australian rules footballer for Richmond
Fred Clarke (footballer, born 1941), Northern Irish defender
Freddie Clarke (born 1992), English rugby union flanker

Others
Sir Fred Clarke (educationist) (1880–1952), English director of the University of London Institute of Education
F. A. S. Clarke (Frederick Arthur Stanley Clarke, 1892–1972), British brigadier who served in both World Wars
Frederick J. Clarke (1915–2002), American lieutenant general with Army Corps of Engineers

See also
Frederick Clarke Withers (1828–1901), English architect in America
Frederick Clarke Tate (1849–1920), Canadian legislator in Saskatchewan
Frederick Clark (disambiguation)